The Gambler is the sixth studio album by Kenny Rogers, released by United Artists in November 1978. One of his most popular, it has established Rogers' status as one of the most successful artists of the 1970s and 1980s. The album reached many markets around the world, such as the Far East and Jamaica, with Rogers later commenting "When I go to Korea or Hong Kong people say 'Ah, the gambler!'" (as per the sleeve notes to the 1998 released box set Through the Years on Capitol Records). The album has sold over 
5 million copies.

The title track "The Gambler" was written by Don Schlitz, who was the first to record it. It was also covered by several other artists, but it was Kenny Rogers' adaptation of the tale that went on to top the country charts and win a Song of the Year Grammy, later becoming Rogers' signature song. Although Johnny Cash recorded the song first, Rogers's version was released first. Both this song and "She Believes in Me" became pop music hits, helping Rogers become well-known beyond country music circles. Although largely compiled from songs by some of the music business's top songwriters, such as Alex Harvey, Mickey Newbury, and Steve Gibb, Rogers continued to show his own talent for songwriting with "Morgana Jones". The album was produced by Larry Butler.

Its popularity has led to many releases over the years. After United Artists was absorbed into EMI/Capitol in 1980, "The Gambler" was reissued on vinyl and cassette on the Liberty Records label. Several years later, Liberty issued an abridged version of the album, removing the track "Morgana Jones". EMI Manhattan Records released "The Gambler" on CD in the 1980s. An 'Original Master Recording' from Mobile Fidelity Sound Labs was released on vinyl (audiophile edition vinyl). Finally, "The Gambler" was released on Rogers' own Dreamcatcher Records in 2001 as part of the Kenny Rogers "Original Masters Series."

In Britain, both the title cut and the album did very well in the country market, but both failed to reach the top 40 of the pop charts. In the 1980s the single of "The Gambler" was re-issued and made the top 100 sales list, but again charted outside the top 40. It wasn't until the song was re-issued in 2007 when the song was adopted by the England Rugby Team at the Rugby World Cup that it charted at its #22 peak.

Additionally, "I Wish That I Could Hurt That Way Again" was later a single in 1986 for T. Graham Brown, whose version went to #3 on the country charts.

Track listing

Personnel
 Kenny Rogers – lead vocals 
 Thomas Cain – keyboards (side 1: 5)
 Steve Glassmeyer – keyboards, soprano saxophone (side 1: 2), backing vocals
 Gene Golden – keyboards, backing vocals
 Hargus "Pig" Robbins – keyboards (side 1: 1)
 Edgar Struble – ARP synthesizer, clavinet, congas, backing vocals (side 2: 11)
 Jimmy Capps – guitars (side 1: 1)
 Randy Dorman – guitars, backing vocals (side 1: 5)
 Ray Edenton – guitars (side 1: 1)
 Rick Harper – guitars
 Billy Sanford – guitars (side 1: 1)
 Jerry Shook – guitars
 Tony Joe White – guitars (side 1: 5)
 Reggie Young – guitars
 Pete Drake – steel guitar (side 1: 1)
 Tommy Allsup – six-string bass guitar
 Bob Moore – upright bass (side 1: 1)
 Dennis Wilson – upright bass
 Eddy Anderson – drums, percussion
 Jerry Carrigan – drums, percussion (side 1: 1)
 Bobby Daniels – drums, percussion, backing vocals
 Byron Metcalf – drums, percussion (side 2: 1)
 Bill Justis – string arrangements (side 1: 3, side 2: 1, 3, 5)
 Byron Bach – strings
 George Brinkley – strings
 Marvin Chantry – strings
 Roy Christensen – strings
 Carl Gorodetzky – strings
 Lennie Haight – strings
 Sheldon Kurland – strings
 Steven Smith – strings
 Gary Vanosdale – strings
 Pamela Vanosdale – strings
 Dottie West – backing vocals (side 1: 1)
 The Jordanaires – backing vocals (side 1: 1)
 Bill Medley – backing vocals (side 1: 5)
 Mickey Newbury – backing vocals (side 1: 5)

Producer
 Producer – Larry Butler
 Engineer – Billy Sherrill
 Recorded at Jack Clement Recording Studios (Nashville, TN).
 Mastered by Bob Sowell at Master Control  (Nashville, TN).
 Art Direction and Design – Bill Burks
 Photography – Reid Miles
 Management – Ken Kragen

Charts

Weekly charts

Year-end charts

Certifications

References

External links
 [ Allmusic.com The Gambler album]

1978 albums
Kenny Rogers albums
United Artists Records albums
Albums arranged by Bill Justis
Albums produced by Larry Butler (producer)